The Song and Dance Man is a 1926 American silent comedy drama film produced by Famous Players-Lasky and released through Paramount Pictures. It is based on a play by George M. Cohan and was directed by Herbert Brenon. A copy of the film is housed in the Library of Congress collection. Of its original seven reels, only the final five survive.

Plot 
"Happy" Farrell (Moore) wants to be a famous song and dance man. He befriends a young dancer, Leola (Love), who accompanies him to an audition. Leola is given a contract, but Happy is not. Happy changes careers and becomes successful, but still yearns to be a song and dance man. After three years, Leola plans to retire from dancing so that she can get married, but Happy returns to pursue his original dream. Leola is inspired by this, and her fiancé agrees to let her continue her dancing career.

Cast

Reception
The film received mixed reviews. Although the actors were praised, the plot was criticized because the two leads were not reunited at the end of the film.

References

External links

 
 
 
 Lobby poster

1926 films
1920s English-language films
American silent feature films
American black-and-white films
American films based on plays
Films directed by Herbert Brenon
Paramount Pictures films
1926 comedy-drama films
1920s American films
Silent American comedy-drama films